Argyle Goolsby (born Steve Matthews in 1979) is an American musician, best known for being the lead vocalist, bassist and co-founder of horror punk band Blitzkid (1997–2012).

When Blitzkid disbanded in 2012, Goolsby pursued a career as a solo artist as Argyle Goolsby. He performs with both his live electric band, The Roving Midnight, as well as his fully acoustic band, The Hollow Bodies.

Career

Blitzkid (1997–2012) 

Goolsby was born in Bluefield, West Virginia. In 1997, Goolsby and lead guitarist and vocalist T.B. Monstrosity (Tracy Byrd) started the punk rock band Blitzkid. Drawing their inspiration from B-movies and horror movie classics, the band was soon considered to belong to the subgenre of horror punk, which emerged in the wake of the Misfits.

In the 2000s, Blitzkid developed an underground following in the US and especially in Europe. Most of the band's albums were released through German horror punk group The Other's label, FiendForce Records.

Between 1997 and 2012, Goolsby recorded seven studio albums with Blitzkid and several split EPs. Many of the group's songs were featured on horror punk compilations in the 2000s, such as Mullets & Alcoholics (SFL Records, 2003), Flesheaters! (1332 Records, 2006), Gothic Compilation Part XLII (Batbeliever Releases, 2008), Get Acquainted Vol. 1 (THENEXTART, 2008) or The Sound of Horror Vol. 1 (Robot Monster, 2010).

With Blitzkid, Goolsby has toured in 29 countries, played over 700 shows and performed with several other bands and artists like Nim Vind, Stellar Corpses, The Cryptkeeper Five, The Damned, Leftöver Crack, The Crimson Ghosts, Strung Out and Face to Face. Biltzkid was also part of many festivals and music events such as the Summer Breeze Open Air, the M'era Luna Festival or the Amphi Festival.

On November 10, 2012, during their final "Return to the Living Tour", Blitzkid played their last concert in Düsseldorf, Germany.

When questioned about the band's retirement, Goolsby stated:

"It is not that we don't believe in what we are doing anymore. It's not that Blitzkid has become a burden. I have still plenty of music that I have written and that I am currently writing. Our music is not an extinguished flame. Retirement is more of a practical decision for right now."

In November 2016, Jeff Frumess filmed a documentary titled Blitzkid: Return to the Living, which includes a part on the history of the band and two others that are dedicated respectively to the group's experience on the road and some live performances. The documentary was co-written and produced by Goolsby.

Notable collaborations 

While remaining in Blitzkid, Goolsby collaborated on several occasions with former members of the Misfits. In 2002, Goolsby played bass as a tour member for The Undead, a horror punk band led by Bobby Steele (the second guitarist of the Misfits original lineup).

The following year, he recorded three bass tracks on Diagnosis for Death (2003), an album released by Dr. Chud (ex-Misfits drummer of the Michale Graves Era) with his new band named Dr. Chud's X-Ward. Goolsby was also a tour member for Chud's band

In 2004, Goolsby collaborated with Mister Monster, performing back vocal duties and playing bass on the Deep Dark EP (Hell's Hundred Records). Following the departure of Wednesday 13's bassist Kid Kid in 2006, Goolsby was hired as a replacing bassist to fill in for three shows.

In 2007, ex-Misfits lead guitarist Doyle Wolfgang von Frankenstein was looking for a vocalist for his solo band project, Gorgeous Frankenstein and finally recruited Landon Blood for the recording of an eponymous album. Blood left the band shortly after and was replaced by Argyle Goolsby who played bass and performed vocal duties for Gorgeous Frankenstein first tour, opening for Danzig. Dr. Chud (drums) and Stephanie Bellars (aka Gorgeous George, Doyle's ex-wife) were also part of this line up.

In 2009, Goolsby took part of what is sometimes referred as the Misfits "Near-Reunion" in New Jersey. Performing as an opening act for Danzig, this lineup included Doyle Wolfgang von Frankenstein (lead guitar), Dr. Chud (drums), Michale Graves (vocals) and Goolsby (bass) (Jerry Only, the Misfits original bassist, did not participate in the event).

Goolsby had written many songs that he intended to work on with Gorgeous Frankenstein, but since the band project was abandoned, most of this material became part of Blitzkid's last album, Apparitional. From the ashes of Gorgeous Frankenstein, Doyle Wolfgang von Frankenstein founded a new horror metal band eponymously named Doyle with vocalist Alex Story in 2012.

Recent projects (2012–2017) 

Following Blitkid's disestablishment in 2012, Goolsby started a solo career with a new band project named Argyle Goolsby and the Roving Midnight. He has been steadily releasing EPs and singles since 2012. In 2015, a compilation album, Saturnalia of the Accursed which collects two EPs and a few other songs was released as well as a cover of "Save Me Tonight" by White Sister, originally featured on the soundtrack of Fright Night (1985)."

In 2016, Goolsby started a series of concert with a fully acoustic band, The Hollow Bodies, playing both his own material and some Blitzkid songs.

Inspiration and songwriting 

Goolsby has always been fascinated by cryptozoological monsters, Horror movies and horror fiction, which are the core inspiration for his songwriting as well as folklore and ghost stories (especially those native to his home in Appalachia).

His work is also inspired by the aesthetics of the Gilded Age, German Expressionist films and the era of silent cinema in general.

His lyrics deal with real-world subjects projected through horror-themed metaphors, a writing style he acknowledges being influence by the Misfits.

For Goolsby, horror is not only an inspiration, but it is also a lifestyle, an aesthetic approach that focuses on "a conjured presence". In this respect, during his live performances, he is often disguised as a monster, personifying a vampire or a zombie.

If shocking can be considered as a major aspect of Goolsby's songwriting and style, it is also part of his own reflection on horror as a means of expression. As he suggests it himself:

"If you really stop to think about it, a lot of the monsters aren't really the monsters, it is man that's the monster. So a lot of horror movies are social commentaries in a way, which is what punk rock is. So a really nice blend of metaphor and humanity for the most part and that's what I like the most about it. I like the duality of man, you can be a monster and you can be human. It's just all wrapped together."

Musical instruments 

Goolsby has a copyrighted bass design called "The Haxxan" (Iron Lung Guitars, England), a name that refers to Häxan, a Danish silent horror movie, but he is most noted for his use of a Fender Aerodyne bass and a Telefunken M80 chrome microphone. He also makes use of "The Levitation Station" during his live performances. This personal invention can be described as a custom microphone stand on which he can climb and hover, giving the illusion of floating.

Musicians (The Roving Midnight) 

 Johnny Ott – guitar/backup vocals
 Shadow Windhawk (Noah Bailey) – guitar/backup vocals
 Mike Groch – bass/backup vocals
 Dave Noonan – drums
 Marc Poulin – drums
 Andrew Winter – drums
 Adam Parent – drums
 Tony Kirkham – drums
 Willie Wolfbite – bass
 Howie Wowie – bass
 Emilio Menze – bass
 Gozer – guitar
 Carlos "Loki" Cofino – guitar
 Jimmy Ray Harrington – guitar
 Nate Bane – guitar
 Jason Trioxin – guitar
 Nick Arabatzis – keyboards
 Jack Deskins – keyboards/saxophone

Personal life 

Aside from his musical career, Goolsby also works as a tattoo artist in his hometown of Bluefield. As an ordained minister, he offers his services to officiate wedding ceremonies or provide live entertainment through GigSalad, an online marketplace for booking entertainment and services for events.

Goolsby runs his own label and publishing company, A Corpse with No Name Productions (A.C.W.N.N.), located in New Milford, Connecticut.

He married his longtime girlfriend Jordan Paoletta on October 21, 2017. The service was ordained by Victoria Price at Witch's Dungeon Classic Movie Museum in Bristol, Connecticut.

Discography

Blitzkid (1997–2012) 
Albums
 Terrifying Tales – Death by Jersey, independent, 1999 ; A Corpse with No Name Music, 2006
 Let Flowers Die, Antidote Records, 2001
 Trace of a Stranger, Fiendforce Records, 2003
 Five Cellars Below, Fiendforce Records 2006 			
 Apparitional, People Like You Records, 2011

Split EPs, 7", 10"
 Blitzkid / Mister Monster, Exhuming Graves and Making Dates, EP, Fiendforce Records, 2004
 Blitzkid / The Spook, Everyday Is Halloween – Tales of Terror And Unspeakable Horror, 7", Fiendforce Records, 2004
 Blitzkid / The Cryptkeeper Five, No Balls Records, 2007
 Blitzkid / Nim Vind, Fistfull of Balls, Volume 1, 7" (2x), No Balls Records, 2010
 Blitzkid / The Cryptkeeper Five, Split Personalities, 10", The Black Sneer, 2012

Singles
 "Head Over Hills", 7", "I Used to Fuck People Like You in Prison" Records, 2011

Compilation
 Anatomy of Reanimation, Fiendforce Records, 2008

Video
 Terrifying Tales – Death by Jersey, A Corpse with No Name Music, 2006 (live at Connections in Clifton, New Jersey on May 28 and October 31, 2005)

Mister Monster 
 Deep Dark (EP), 2003

Dr. Chud's X-Ward 
 Dr. Chud's X-Ward, Diagnosis for Death, Bloodwork Records, 2004

1476 
 A Wolf's Age, not on label, limited edition, 2009 (vocals, two songs written, credited as Steve Matthews)

Solo releases 
 A Dream Not Quite Remembered..., EP, No Balls Records, 2012
 Under The Witness Stars, EP, A Corpse with No Name, 2013
 Argyle Goolsby / The Big Bad, The Wild And Woeful West Virginia, 7", A Corpse wth No Name, 2013
 "Thickets", Single, A Corpse with No Name, 2015
 "Your Enemy's Best Friend", File, MP3, Single, A Corpse with No Name, 2015
 "Baskerville", Single, A Corpse with No Name, 2015
 Saturnalia of the Accursed, Compilation, No Balls Records/A Corpse with No Name, 2015 (Includes "The Being", a song inspired by the Flatwoods monster)
 Darken your Doorstep, A Corpse with No Name, 2017
 "Save Me Tonight", Single, A Corpse with No Name, 2017
 Hollow Bodies, A Corpse with No Name, 2018

Guest appearances 
 Serpenteens, "Destroy Your World" (vocals), The Superhuman Monstershow, Blood and Guts Records, 2007
 The Spook, Let There Be Dark (vocals), Fiendfoce Records, 2008
 The Crimson Ghosts, Dead Eyes Can See (vocals), Fiendfoce Records, 2008
 The Crimson Ghosts, Generation Gore (vocals), Contra Light Records, 2010
 The Cryptkeeper Five, The Unbeatable Cry (vocals), The Cryptkeeper Five self-released, 2011
 Zombina and the Skeletones, "Love Is Strange" (vocals), Zombina and the Skeletones self-released, 2014
 The Big Bad, The Big Bad, (vocals), Digital release, 2014
 Pyogenesis, A Century in the Curse of Time (vocals), AFM Records, 2015
 The Fright, "Edward" (vocals), Rising Beyond, 7Hard, 2015
 Bloodsucking Zombies from Outer Space, Mister Barlow (vocals), Earthquake Files, 2016
 Mister Monster, Life at the end of October (bass/vocals), 2017 (upcoming album)

Films and videos 
 Michael P. Russin, Blitzkid: Death by Jersey, 2009 (live at Connections in Clifton, New Jersey, on May 28 and October 31, 2005)
 You Must See It to Believe It!!!, Live, Evilive, 2010 (includes two videos ("Gorgeous Frankenstein" and "Man or Monster") and a 2008 tour documentary)
 Paul Basile, Living the American Nightmare, 2011 (documentary about Myke Hideous)
 Jeff Frumess, Blitzkid: Return to the Living, 2016
 Lloyd Kaufman, Shakespeare's Sh*tstorm, Troma Films, 2019

Gallery

References

External links 

 Argyle Goolsby's official website
 A Corpse with No Name Productions
 Blitzkid's official website

Living people
1979 births
American rock singers
American punk rock singers
American punk rock bass guitarists
Horror punk musicians
American male singers
Songwriters from West Virginia
People from Bluefield, West Virginia
Singers from West Virginia
Guitarists from West Virginia
American male guitarists
21st-century American bass guitarists
21st-century American male musicians
American male songwriters